Badinogo is a village in the Kongoussi Department of Bam Province in northern Burkina Faso. It lies to the north of Kongoussi.  It has a population of 800. It is sometimes listed as Badinogo-1 to distinguish it from the smaller village Badinogo-2 to the west of Kongoussi.

References

External links
Satellite map at Maplandia.com

Populated places in the Centre-Nord Region
Bam Province